The Autobiography of My Body is a novel by the American writer David Guy set in 1980s Pittsburgh, Pennsylvania.

It tells the story of the sexual liberation of Charles Bradford, who after a bad marriage has returned to his hometown to be near his ailing father. There he meets Andrea, a feminist and political activist, and they start a torrid affair that forces him to reexamine his life.

Reaction
The New York Times called it "an intimate portrait of a man torn between appetite and intellect, a sort of Portnoy's Complaint for gentiles" and a "painstaking explication of habit and longing" in an ambiguous review.

References

Further reading

 "The Autobiography of My Body" (Review), Kirkus Reviews, Feb 27, 1990, https://www.kirkusreviews.com/book-reviews/david-guy/the-autobiography-of-my-body/#review

1991 American novels
Novels set in Pittsburgh
Fiction set in the 1980s
Dutton Penguin books